Menthogen is a topically applied scalp stimulant which is claimed by its manufacturers to treat itchiness and irritation of the scalp as well as combating certain types of alopecia. Since its development (see history below) Menthogen has been further developed in the UK by a team of trichologists.

Menthogen's scalp cooling effect occurs due to the presence of menthol and alcohol within the formula. Other ingredients are claimed to counteract the effects of androgens said to contribute to both male and female pattern hair loss.

History
Menthogen was originally created and developed by Mr F.J. Cunningham MIT (Lond) MAE FRSPH at his dispensary in Castleton, Rochdale, Greater Manchester in 2002 for in clinic use with private clinic patient's within his trichology centre. A year long private double-blind study was undertaken to study the assumed benefits of the formulation.

Science
Menthogen contains vasodilators; stimulators which act upon blood capillaries and hair bulbs (roots) which have the effect of increasing the blood supply (and therefore nourishment) to the scalp and its hair's bulbs. Phytohormones are also present. These natural plant substances that, at low concentration, are claimed to influence hair growth and are present in many of the other 300 000 available hair loss solution products available in the northern hemisphere.

Usage
Menthogen is applied daily in the evening before retiring as this is claimed to allow improved penetration of the product; as the body relaxes during sleep so to does the dermis of the scalp.

Side effects
Menthogen can cause a slight 'tingling' of the scalp when applied due to the action of the vasodiliators. Users may also notice a slight pinkish reddening of the skin where the product is applied.

References

External links 
 - Official Menthogen website
 
Human hair